Mircea Irimescu (born 13 May 1959) is a Romanian former professional footballer who played for Universitatea Craiova. He earned 9 caps for the Romania national team and participated in UEFA Euro 1984.

Irimescu spent most of his playing career with Universitatea, but also played for Electroputere Craiova and German side Sportfreunde Siegen before becoming a coach in his home country.

Honours
Universitatea Craiova
Liga I: 1979–80, 1980–81
Cupa României: 1976–77, 1977–78, 1980–81, 1982–83

References

Romania National Team 1980-1989 - Details

External links
 
 

1959 births
Living people
Romanian footballers
Romania international footballers
CS Universitatea Craiova players
Sportfreunde Siegen players
UEFA Euro 1984 players

Association football midfielders
Sportspeople from Craiova